Summerhill is a small settlement  northwest of Amroth, in Pembrokeshire, Wales, in Amroth parish and community.

History
Summerhill was originally where farmers would graze their sheep in the summer, hence the name, but now it is a village of several houses and a corner shop. It is not marked on a pre-1850 map of Amroth parish. A Primitive Methodist chapel was established in 1879; chapel records, including baptisms, Sunday school papers and minutes are held by Pembrokeshire Records Office. By the 1990s the chapel had been converted to a residential property.

Governance
Summerhill comes under the governance of Amroth Community Council.

Amenities
Amroth Parish Hall is in Summerhill. With a capacity of 120, it hosts regular classes and meetings. The present building was constructed in 2008 to replace an earlier 1951 building.

References

Amroth, Pembrokeshire
Hamlets in Wales
Villages in Pembrokeshire